Skull in comics may refer to:

 Skull the Slayer, a Marvel Comics character
 Skull Comics, an underground comic published by Last Gasp Funnies

See also
 Red Skull, a Marvel Comics character
 Skull (disambiguation)